Ned Kahn is an environmental artist and sculptor, known in particular for museum exhibits he has built for the Exploratorium in San Francisco. His works usually intend to capture an invisible aspect of nature and make it visible.

Early life
Kahn was born in New York City and raised in Stamford, Connecticut. At the age of 10, Kahn staged his first exhibition of sculptures fashioned from items salvaged from a junkyard, where his mother had taken him. 

After graduating with a degree in botany and environmental science from the University of Connecticut in 1982, Kahn moved to San Francisco, where he was fascinated by the Exploratorium. He worked there from 1982 to 1996 under the tutelage of the museum's founder, Frank Oppenheimer. Later, Kahn was the artist in residence at the Headlands Center for the Arts starting in 2001.

Kahn moved from San Francisco to Graton, California in 1998 and works from the Ned Kahn Studios in Sebastopol. He is married and has two children. Kahn cites his daily meditation routine as key to his artistic development.

Awards

Kahn won a MacArthur Foundation "genius grant" fellowship in 2003, and the National Design Award for landscape architecture in 2005.

Works

Some examples of Kahn's work to capture the invisible include building facades that move in waves in response to wind; indoor tornadoes and vortices made of fog, steam, or fire; and a transparent sphere containing water and sand which, when spun, erodes a beach-like ripple pattern into the sand surface. In 2003 Kahn collaborated with Koning Eizenberg Architecture, Inc. on Articulated Cloud, a piece installed on the exterior walls of the Children's Museum of Pittsburgh consisting of hundreds of movable flaps that respond to the wind creating visible patterns.

His work is in the collection of di Rosa, Napa.

See also
Environmental art
Environmental sculpture

References

External links

Official website
http://greenmuseum.org/kahn

American artists
Environmental artists
Living people
Year of birth missing (living people)
MacArthur Fellows
University of Connecticut alumni